Ronan Raftery is an Irish actor in television, film and stage.

Television

Film

Theatre

References

External links

Year of birth missing (living people)
Living people
Male actors from Dublin (city)
Irish male television actors
Irish male film actors
Irish male stage actors